Nerijus Astrauskas (born 18 October 1980) is a Lithuanian former professional footballer who played as a forward.

Honours
Lithuania
 Baltic Cup: 2005

References

External links

1980 births
Living people
People from Šiauliai
Lithuanian footballers
Association football forwards
Lithuania international footballers
Maltese Premier League players
Cypriot Second Division players
Gamma Ethniki players
FC Šiauliai players
FC Vilnius players
Radomiak Radom players
FK Žalgiris players
FK Liepājas Metalurgs players
Ayia Napa FC players
Niki Volos F.C. players
Veria F.C. players
Rabat Ajax F.C. players
FK Riteriai players
Inter Leipzig players
Kastoria F.C. players
Lithuanian expatriate sportspeople in Poland
Expatriate footballers in Poland
Lithuanian expatriate sportspeople in Cyprus
Expatriate footballers in Cyprus
Lithuanian expatriate sportspeople in Latvia
Expatriate footballers in Latvia
Lithuanian expatriate sportspeople in Greece
Expatriate footballers in Greece
Lithuanian expatriate sportspeople in Malta
Expatriate footballers in Malta
Lithuanian expatriate sportspeople in Germany
Expatriate footballers in Germany